Unaccompanied Minors (also known as Grounded in the United Kingdom and the Republic of Ireland) is a 2006 Christmas comedy film directed by Paul Feig and starring Lewis Black, Wilmer Valderrama, Tyler James Williams, Dyllan Christopher, Brett Kelly, Gia Mantegna, and Quinn Shephard.

The film is based on a true story by Susan Burton first told on the public radio show This American Life, under the title In the Event of an Emergency, Put Your Sister in an Upright Position in 2001.

Unaccompanied Minors was released on December 8, 2006 by Warner Bros. Pictures. It received mixed reviews from critics and grossed $21 million against a $25 million budget.

Plot
Spencer Davenport and his sister Katherine must fly from California to Pennsylvania on Christmas Eve to spend the holidays with their dad. During their layover at the Midwestern Hoover International Airport, a massive blizzard grounds all planes and cancels all flights, and the siblings are sent to the anarchic UM (unaccompanied minor) room, where they meet Christmas-spirited smarty-pants Charlie Goldfinch, surly tomboy Donna Malone, arrogant rich girl Grace Conrad, and mysterious Beef Wellington.

Charlie, Spencer, Beef, Grace, and Donna sneak out, and proceed to enjoy themselves around the airport. When they are caught by the airport security guards and returned to the UM room, they find that the other minors, Katherine included, have been sent to a lodge down the road, and that the grouchy head of passenger relations, Oliver Porter — whose trip to Hawaii is among the canceled flights — intends for the kids to spend Christmas Eve in the UM room. Knowing that it will break Katherine's faith in Santa Claus if she does not receive a present by the next morning, Spencer asks the others to help him get a present for his sister in return for a plan to escape.

With Spencer's plan, the minors give Zach Van Bourke, the friendly clerk watching them, the slip, but Mr. Porter grows desperate to get the kids back, and sends all the airport guards to find them. After Donna and Grace get into a fight, Spencer decides that they're going to have to put their differences aside and work together, and Beef leaves to go and get a Christmas tree. Along the way, he reflects on how his step-father, Ernie, hoped to make him stronger by saying men are made, not born. Meanwhile, Spencer and Katherine's father tries to drive to the airport in his biodiesel fueled car, but it eventually breaks down at a gas station. However, the owner lets him borrow a Hummer.

The minors head to a thinly secured exit in the back of the airport, letting a dog loose to distract the guards. While they hide from Mr. Porter in the baggage claim, Charlie, who is hiding in a suitcase, gets placed on a conveyor transport; Donna goes after him, putting herself on a wild ride. Spencer and Grace follow them to the unclaimed baggage warehouse, where they find many wonderful presents, including a set of walkie-talkies, and a doll for Katherine.

However, they are seen dancing to Lee Morgan's performance of The Sidewinder on security cameras, and Mr. Porter and the guards chase the minors through the warehouse. Using a canoe, the minors take Zach captive and sled to the lodge while pursued by the guards, and manage to elude Mr. Porter long enough to find Katherine asleep in the lobby, and place the doll in her arms. While running around the lodge, Grace has to remove her contact lenses and put on glasses, which made her look like a dork in the past (but not to Spencer). With their mission completed, the minors go back to the airport with Mr. Porter quietly. He has them bumped from their flights and placed under surveillance in separate rooms. The minors then confess their true feelings on why they act the way they do. An emotional Grace admits that even though her parents are still together, they emancipated her, as she just returned from boarding school and spends most of her time at airports. Spencer, feeling bad, devises a plan to escape.

Using the walkie-talkies, the minors tamper with the security cameras and escape through air ducts. They find the Christmas decorations Mr. Porter confiscated, and Beef returns with a huge Christmas tree that he traded his prized Aquaman action figure for. With Zach's help, the minors decorate the airport, and take items from the unclaimed baggage warehouse to use as presents for the rest of the stranded passengers. Mr. Porter finds Spencer to admit defeat and reveals that he's unhappy because he never really gets to spend time with his family during Christmas, as well as his wife divorcing him five years ago. Spencer inspires some holiday spirit in the man with some friendly words and the gift of a snow globe. On Christmas morning, Mr. Porter dresses up as Santa Claus to hand out presents to the passengers and has the minors' flights restored, Spencer reunites with Katherine, their father arrives to pick them up, Beef tells a girl about his trek to find a Christmas tree, Charlie and Donna exchange phone numbers and share a kiss, and Grace accepts Spencer's invitation to spend Christmas with him and his family.

Cast
 Dyllan Christopher as Spencer Davenport
 Lewis Black as Oliver Porter
 Gia Mantegna as Grace Conrad
 Tyler James Williams as Charles "Charlie" Goldfinch
 Quinn Shephard as Donna Malone
 Wilmer Valderrama as Zach Van Bourke
 Brett Kelly as Timothy "Beef" Wellington
 Dominique Saldaña as Katherine Davenport
 Paget Brewster as Valerie Davenport
 Rob Corddry as Samuel "Sam" Davenport
 Wayne Federman as Airport Attendant
 Mario Lopez as Part-Time Substitute minors watcher
 Jessica Walter as Cindi
 Rob Riggle as Head Guard Hoffman
 David Koechner as Ernie
 B. J. Novak as Tommy Black
 Mindy Kaling as Restaurant Hostess
 Tony Hale as Alan Davies
 Cedric Yarbrough as Melvin "Mel" Goldfinch
 Kristen Wiig as Carole Malone
 Al Roker as Himself
 Teri Garr as Aunt Judy (uncredited)
 The Kids in the Hall's Bruce McCulloch, Kevin McDonald, and Mark McKinney as Mr. Porter's security guards (aka 'The Guards In The Hall')
 Former Kevin and Bean co-host Allie Mac Kay as Perky Presenter

Production
Shooting on this film went on in both Salt Lake City, Utah, and also in Scotland.

Soundtrack
Tyler James Williams performed a song for the film with the same name as the film, but was not used in the film, but in a television spot to promote the film.

Reception

Box office 
Unaccompanied Minors grossed $16.7 million in the United States, and $5.3 million in other territories, for a worldwide gross of $21.9 million, against a production budget of $25 million.

The film grossed $5.7 million in its opening weekend, finishing seventh. In its second weekend it dropped 39% to $3.5 million, finishing 10th.

Critical response 
The website's critics consensus reads: "Unaccompanied Minors, while featuring credible performances by its mostly young cast, is simply a rehash of other, funnier movies." On Metacritic the film has a weighted average score of 43 out of 100 based on 22 critics, indicating "mixed or average reviews". Audiences polled by CinemaScore gave the film an average grade of "B+" on an A+ to F scale.

See also
 List of Christmas films
 Unaccompanied minor

References

External links

 
 
 

2006 films
2000s adventure comedy films
American adventure comedy films
American Christmas comedy films
Australian Christmas comedy films
Australian adventure comedy films
2000s English-language films
This American Life
Comedy films based on actual events
Films set in airports
Films set in Kansas
Films shot in Salt Lake City
Films scored by Michael Andrews
Films directed by Paul Feig
Films produced by Lauren Shuler Donner
2000s Christmas comedy films
2000s Christmas films
Village Roadshow Pictures films
Warner Bros. films
2006 comedy films
2000s American films